Coleophora yuzhongensis is a moth of the family Coleophoridae. It is found in Gansu, China.

References

yuzhongensis
Moths of Asia
Moths described in 1999